Persophilia refers to the appreciation and love of the culture, people or history of Iran (Persia).
The earliest use of the word may have been by the Royal Numismatic Society in 1838; it referred to a king of Marium, in modern-day Cyprus. The opposite of Persophilia is Persophobia or anti-Iranianism.

Origins 

Admiration of the Persians was especially high during the Achaemenid dynasty. Its founder, Cyrus the Great, was the only Gentile to be considered a messiah in the Bible. Alexander the Great, who conquered the empire in its entirely, was himself an avid admirer of Cyrus the Great, and adopted Persian customs. The Macedonian satrap Peucestas gained the support of his subjects in Persis due to his Persophilia. Ancient Greek leaders of the Achaemenid period who gave themselves Persian titles or names were considered Persophiles. The kings of Sidonian whose governmental policies gave special rights to the Persians may also be referred to as Persophiles.

Caucasian leaders who sided with the Sasanians are branded as Persophiles, such as Stephen I of Iberia.

Early Abbasid caliphs Harun al-Rashid and Al-Ma'mun are described as Persophile by the English author Percy Sykes, due to their pro-Persian policies.

Admiration of Persian culture continued in Mughal Empire in South Asia; for example, Abdul Rahim Khan-e-Khana being the foremost Persophile of his time.

One of the most prominent contemporary Persophiles was the British literary historian Edward Granville Browne, who participated in the 1906 Persian Constitutional Revolution.

A recent book on Persophilia is the Iranian Hamid Dabashi is "Persophilia, Persian Culture on the Global Scene".

Other Persophiles 
Alexander the Great (356-323 BC)
Pausanias
Xenophon
Johann Wolfgang von Goethe, the author of West–Eastern Diwan
Georg Wilhelm Friedrich Hegel
Edward FitzGerald
Friedrich Nietzsche
Mehmed Tahir Münif Pasha
Muhammad Iqbal
Arthur Upham Pope
Howard Baskerville
Richard Nelson Frye
Peter Avery
Coleman Barks
John Limbert
Garnik Asatrian
Richard Foltz
Dick Davis

See also 

 Medism
 Persianate society

References 

Admiration of foreign cultures
Iranian culture
Iranian nationalism
Orientalism by type